The Timothy Davis House (also known as Witt Funeral Home and the Leonard Funeral Home) is a historic building located at 405 First Street NW in Elkader, Iowa.

Description and history 
Timothy Davis was a businessman, attorney and town speculator, who along with John Thompson and Chester Sage laid out the town of Elkader in the mid-1840s. They built a saw- and gristmill here before Davis moved back to Dubuque. He returned to Elkader a couple years later and built this home, where he spent his remaining years. The 2½-story brick structure was built in the vernacular Federal style. Its dominate decorative feature is the front porch, which is a recreation of the original.

Ground was broken for the house on June 13, 1866.

The house has subsequently been used as a funeral home, and it was listed on the National Register of Historic Places on June 22, 1976.

References

Houses completed in 1860
Death care companies of the United States
Houses in Elkader, Iowa
National Register of Historic Places in Clayton County, Iowa
Houses on the National Register of Historic Places in Iowa
Federal architecture in Iowa